Duke of Saint-Simon was a title in the Peerage of France and later in the Peerage of Spain. It was granted in 1635 to Claude de Rouvroy, comte de Rasse. The title's name refers to the seigneury that was held by the Rouvroy family at Saint-Simon in Aisne.

The dukedom passed from father to son in 1693. The second and last holder of the title, Louis de Rouvroy, has been immortalized as one of the greatest memoirists in European history.

The second duke's two sons both predeceased him, making the French dukedom extinct in 1755. However, the second duke’s title had been introduced into the Spanish peerage and granted Grandee status when he was ambassador there. This meant that the Spanish Dukedom of Saint-Simon could be inherited through the female line, and descendants continued to use this title until the 19th century.

Dukes of Saint-Simon (1635)

See also 
 Charles François de Rouvroy
 Henri de Saint-Simon
 Hubert Jean Victor, Marquis de Saint-Simon

References